Brendle is a surname. Notable people with the surname include:

Simon Brendle (born 1981), German mathematician
Tara E. Brendle, American mathematician
Tiago Brendle (born 1985), Brazilian volleyball player

See also
Brendle's, a defunct retail company of the United States